Olga Karasyova, also known as Olga Kovalenko, (born 24 July 1949) is a former Soviet gymnast who competed in the 1968 Summer Olympics. Olga was coached by Igor Zhuravlev at CSKA Moscow. She is married to fellow gymnast Valery Karasyov, and studied French at the Pedagogical Institute.

In 1994, it was reported that Karasyova had told German television channel RTL she and her former teammates were forced to participate in abortion doping shortly before the 1968 Olympics, due to the supposed physical benefits of pregnancy. Girls who refused to have sex with their coaches were said to be removed from the team, and after ten weeks, the girls were forced to have an abortion. While rumours of such practices with Soviet, Scandinavian and East German female gymnasts had been around since the 1950s, no credible evidence had ever been given until Karasyova's apparent disclosure.

Several days later, however, it was discovered the woman who was interviewed was an impostor: Karasyova was actually on a sea cruise as the time, and had watched the broadcast. She sued for libel, and in 2000, the Moscow Ismail Court awarded her 35,000 roubles in damages. Despite her legal victory, the original interviews attributed to her continue to be reported as facts by some third parties.

References

1949 births
Living people
Sportspeople from Bishkek
Kyrgyzstani female artistic gymnasts
Soviet female artistic gymnasts
Olympic gymnasts of the Soviet Union
Gymnasts at the 1968 Summer Olympics
Olympic gold medalists for the Soviet Union
Olympic medalists in gymnastics
Medalists at the 1968 Summer Olympics
European champions in gymnastics